In the 2012–13 season, Trabzonspor finished in ninth place in the Süper Lig. The top scorer of the team was Adrian Mierzejewski, who scored thirteen goals.

This article shows statistics of the club's players and matches during the season.

Sponsor
Türk Telekom

Players

Super Lig

Turkish Cup

Fourth round

Fifth round

Group stage

Semi-final

Second leg

Final

UEFA Europa League

Play-off round

See also
2012–13 Turkish Cup

References

External links

Trabzonspor
Trabzonspor seasons